The 1st West Virginia Veteran Infantry Regiment  was an infantry regiment that served in the Union Army during the last year of the American Civil War. It consisted primarily of veterans of older regiments whose terms of enlistment had expired.

History

The 1st West Virginia Veteran Volunteer Infantry Regiment was mustered into Federal service on November 9, 1864, composed of re-enlisting veterans from the 5th and the 9th West Virginia Volunteer Infantry Regiments.

The regiment was mustered out of Federal service on July 21, 1865. Its lineage went on to be part of the 150th Cavalry Regiment in the modern-day West Virginia National Guard.

Commanders
 Colonel William Henry Enochs

References
The Civil War Archive

See also
West Virginia Units in the Civil War
West Virginia in the Civil War

Units and formations of the Union Army from West Virginia
1864 establishments in West Virginia
Military units and formations established in 1864
Military units and formations disestablished in 1865